Garrett Gerloff (born August 1, 1995) is an American motorcycle racer who has competed in the Superbike World Championship since 2020 riding a Yamaha YZF-R1. New for 2023 is a move to a BMW M1000RR2 machine.
 
He was a two-time champion MotoAmerica in the Supersport class after taking first place overall in 2016 and 2017.

Career

Early career 
Beginning in 2007 Gerloff began competing in the Western Eastern Roadracing Association (WERA). By the 2010 and 2011 seasons he was competing and finishing first and second overall in the Superbike and Superstock categories on a Yamaha 600.

Following success in the WERA national series, he stepped up to the AMA Daytona Sportbike Championship in 2011 and 2012 beginning in the regional series before moving into the national competition in 2013. In his two years in the Daytona Sportbike Championship, he finished 3rd in 2013 and 6th in 2014. When MotoAmerica took the place as the national road racing competition, Gerloff landed in the MotoAmerica Supersport class in 2015, finishing 3rd on his first attempt. He become champion in the Supersport class in 2016 and 2017.

MotoAmerica Superbike Championship 
Gerloff's success in Supersport earned him a seat with the factory Yamaha team for the 2018 season in the MotoAmerica Superbike Championship. Gerloff finished the season with 5 podiums and fifth overall in the season standings. Gerloff earned his first Superbike win at Laguna Seca on July 14, 2019. In 2019 he achieved four wins overall and 11 podiums from 20 races. He ultimately finished third in the 2019 overall standings behind Cameron Beaubier and Toni Elias, 51 points behind the champion.

Superbike World Championship 
Gerloff's performances in MotoAmerica lead to a move to the factory-supported GRT Yamaha WorldSBK Junior Team in the 2020 Superbike World Championship. Gerloff finished the season with two third places in Catalunya and Estoril. He ended the year in 11th place with 103 points. He was subsequently signed to a further season with the GRT Yamaha team.

Gerloff made further progress in his second year in World Superbike and was signed to another one year contract to compete with GRT Yamaha WorldSBK team in 2022. He did not record any wins on the season but he increased his number of podium finishes and was a consistent top five finisher throughout most of 2021, though he briefly incurred controversy when he crashed into Factory Yamaha rider Toprak Razgatlioglu at Assen. His improved results helped the GRT Yamaha WorldSBK Team clinch the Independent Team's Championship while Gerloff himself clinched the Independent Rider's Championship as the highest scoring rider not riding for a factory team.

From 2023 season, he joined Bonovo Action BMW Team.

MotoGP World Championship 
After delays to Valentino Rossi's SARS-CoV-2 recovery in November 2020, Gerloff was announced initially to replace Rossi at the European Grand Prix. Gerloff completed the Friday free practice sessions, before Rossi's negative tests allowed his return to the third practice session on Saturday, and Gerloff was subsequently withdrawn from the race weekend.

Gerloff made his MotoGP race debut at the 2021 Dutch TT riding for the Sepang Racing Yamaha team as a replacement for the injured Franco Morbidelli. He was the first American to race in the premier class since his idol Nicky Hayden's last outing in 2016.  Gerloff did not get to ride the newest YZR-M1, instead riding Morbidelli's 'A-Spec' 2019 version. Gerloff finished the race in seventeenth position.

Career statistics

MotoAmerica Superbike Championship

By season

Grand Prix motorcycle racing

By season

By class

Races by year
(key) (Races in bold indicate pole position, races in italics indicate fastest lap)

Superbike World Championship

By season

Races by year
(key) (Races in bold indicate pole position; races in italics indicate fastest lap)

References

External links
 

1995 births
Living people
American motorcycle racers
Sportspeople from Texas
Superbike World Championship riders
Yamaha Motor Racing MotoGP riders
MotoGP World Championship riders
Sepang Racing Team MotoGP riders
21st-century American people